Nechama 'Nama' Hendel (22 August 1936 – 30 September 1998) was an Israeli singer.

She began in the IDF Nahal music troupe, and came out of the Tsahal music scene in the 1950s, first in the duet "Ran veNama" – with Ran Eliran – then later as a solo act. In 1958, Ran Eliran and Hendel were introduced to American audiences by their appearance on The Ed Sullivan Show performing "Tzena Tzena".

Hendel possessed one of the most beautiful voices in Israel. She became world-famous with her smash hit "Machar" ("Tomorrow")- composed by Naomi Shemer featured on the "Jerusalem of Gold" album. She recorded many more of Shemer's songs.

Hendel recorded not only in Hebrew, but in Yiddish as well and was one of the artists included on a Yiddish compilation called "Songs of The Vilna Ghetto" for CBS Records in Israel.

In 1998, Hendel voiced Grandmother Willow in the Hebrew version of the animated movie Pocahontas II: Journey to a New World, and also Grandmother Fa in the Hebrew version of the animated movie Mulan, which was released three months before her death from cardiac arrest on 29 September.

References

External links
 Daliot, Yisrael. "Nechama Hendel." Jewish Women: A Comprehensive Historical Encyclopedia. 1 March 2009. Jewish Women's Archive. 5 January 2010

1936 births
1998 deaths
20th-century Israeli women singers
Yiddish-language singers